Charlie Barnes (25 April 1903 – 27 August 1981) was a former Australian rules footballer who played with Melbourne in the Victorian Football League (VFL).

Notes

External links 

1903 births
1981 deaths
Australian rules footballers from Tasmania
Melbourne Football Club players
Latrobe Football Club players